The uncanny is the psychological experience of something as not simply mysterious, but creepy, often in a strangely familiar way. It may describe incidents where a familiar thing or event is encountered in an unsettling, eerie, or taboo context.

Ernst Jentsch  set out the concept of the uncanny later elaborated on by Sigmund Freud in his 1919 essay Das Unheimliche, which explores the eeriness of dolls and waxworks. For Freud, the uncanny locates the strangeness in the ordinary. Expanding on the idea, psychoanalytic theorist Jacques Lacan wrote that the uncanny places us "in the field where we do not know how to distinguish bad and good, pleasure from displeasure", resulting in an irreducible anxiety that gestures to the Real. The concept has since been taken up by a variety of thinkers and theorists such as roboticist Masahiro Mori's uncanny valley and Julia Kristeva's concept of abjection.

History

German idealism
Philosopher F. W. J. Schelling raised the question of the uncanny in his late Philosophie der Mythologie of 1837, postulating that the Homeric clarity was built upon a prior repression of the uncanny.

In The Will to Power manuscript, German philosopher Friedrich Nietzsche refers to nihilism as "the uncanniest of all guests" and, earlier, in On the Genealogy of Morals he argues it is the "will to truth" that has destroyed the metaphysics that underpins the values of Western culture. Hence, he coins the phrase "European nihilism" to describe the condition that afflicts those Enlightenment ideals that seemingly hold strong values yet undermine themselves.

Ernst Jentsch
Uncanniness was first explored psychologically by Ernst Jentsch in a 1906 essay, On the Psychology of the Uncanny. Jentsch defines the Uncanny as: being a product of "...intellectual uncertainty; so that the uncanny would always, as it were, be something one does not know one’s way about in. The better oriented in his environment a person is, the less readily will he get the impression of something uncanny in regard to the objects and events in it." He expands upon its use in fiction:

Jentsch identifies German writer E. T. A. Hoffmann as a writer who uses uncanny effects in his work, focusing specifically on Hoffmann's story "The Sandman" ("Der Sandmann"), which features a lifelike doll, Olympia.

Sigmund Freud
The concept of the Uncanny was later elaborated on and developed by Sigmund Freud in his 1919 essay "The Uncanny", which also draws on the work of Hoffmann (whom Freud refers to as the "unrivalled master of the uncanny in literature"). However, he criticizes Jentsch's belief that Olympia is the central uncanny element in the story ("The Sandman"):

Instead, Freud draws on a wholly different element of the story, namely, "the idea of being robbed of one's eyes", as the "more striking instance of uncanniness" in the tale.

Freud goes on, for the remainder of the essay, to identify uncanny effects that result from instances of "repetition of the same thing," linking the concept to that of the repetition compulsion. He includes incidents wherein one becomes lost and accidentally retraces one's steps, and instances wherein random numbers recur, seemingly meaningfully (here Freud may be said to be prefiguring the concept that Jung would later refer to as synchronicity). He also discusses the uncanny nature of Otto Rank's concept of the "double".

Freud specifically relates an aspect of the Uncanny derived from German etymology. By contrasting the German adjective unheimlich with its base word heimlich ("concealed, hidden, in secret"), he proposes that social taboo often yields an aura not only of pious reverence but even more so of horror and even disgust, as the taboo state of an item gives rise to the commonplace assumption that that which is hidden from public eye (cf. the eye or sight metaphor) must be a dangerous threat and even an abomination – especially if the concealed item is obviously or presumingly sexual in nature. Basically, the Uncanny is what unconsciously reminds us of our own Id, our forbidden and thus repressed impulses – especially when placed in a context of uncertainty that can remind one of infantile beliefs in the omnipotence of thought. Such uncanny elements are perceived as threatening by our super-ego ridden with oedipal guilt as it fears symbolic castration by punishment for deviating from societal norms. Thus, the items and individuals that we project our own repressed impulses upon become a most uncanny threat to us, uncanny monsters and freaks akin to fairy-tale folk-devils, and subsequently often become scapegoats we blame for all sorts of perceived miseries, calamities, and maladies.

After Freud, Jacques Lacan, in his 1962–1963 seminar "L'angoisse" ("Anxiety"), used the Unheimlich "via regia" to enter into the territory of Angst. Lacan showed how the same image that seduces the subject, trapping him in the narcissistic impasse, may suddenly, by a contingency, show that it is dependent on something, some hidden object, and so the subject may grasp at the same time that he is not autonomous (5 December 1962). For example, and as a paradigm, Guy de Maupassant, in his story "Le Horla", describes a man who suddenly may see his own back in the mirror. His back is there, but it is deprived of the gaze of the subject. It appears as a strange object, until he feels it is his own. There is no cognitive dissonance here, we rather cross all possible cognition, to find ourselves in the field where we do not know how to distinguish bad and good, pleasure from displeasure. And this is the signal of anxiety: the signal of the real, as irreducible to any signifier.

Related theories

This concept is closely related to Julia Kristeva's concept of abjection, where one reacts adversely to something forcefully cast out of the symbolic order. Abjection can be uncanny in that the observer can recognize something within the abject, possibly of what it was before it was 'cast out', yet be repulsed by what it is that caused it to be cast out to begin with. Kristeva lays special emphasis on the uncanny return of the past abject with relation to the 'uncanny stranger'.

Sadeq Rahimi has noted a common relationship between the uncanny and direct or metaphorical visual references, which he explains in terms of basic processes of ego development, specifically as developed by Lacan's theory of the mirror stage. Rahimi presents a wide range of evidence from various contexts to demonstrate how uncanny experiences are typically associated with themes and metaphors of vision, blindness, mirrors and other optical tropes. He also presents historical evidence showing strong presence of ocular and specular themes and associations in the literary and psychological tradition out of which the notion of 'the uncanny' emerged. According to Rahimi, instances of the uncanny like doppelgängers, ghosts, déjà vu, alter egos, self-alienations and split personhoods, phantoms, twins, living dolls, etc. share two important features: that they are closely tied with visual tropes, and that they are variations on the theme of doubling of the ego.

Roboticist Masahiro Mori's essay on human reactions to humanlike entities, Bukimi no Tani Genshō (Valley of Eeriness Phenomenon), describes the gap between familiar living people and their also familiar inanimate representations, such as dolls, puppets, mannequins, prosthetic hands, and android robots. The entities in the valley are between these two poles of common phenomena. Mori has stated that he made the observation independently of Jentsch and Freud, though a link was forged by Reichardt and translators who rendered bukimi as uncanny.

Etymology
Canny is from the Anglo-Saxon root ken: "knowledge, understanding, or cognizance; mental perception: an idea beyond one's ken." Thus the uncanny is something outside one's familiar knowledge or perceptions.

See also

References

Citations

Sources

External links

Freud, 'The Uncanny'

Aesthetics
Psychoanalytic terminology
Fear
Freudian psychology